Imelda Arcilla Papin (born January 26, 1956) is a Filipino singer and politician. Dubbed the "Sentimental Songstress", Papin sang songs such as "Bakit (Kung Liligaya Ka sa Piling ng Iba)" and "Isang Linggong Pag-ibig".

Early life
Papin was born on January 26, 1956, in Presentacion, Camarines Sur. She started her career in a remote fishing village of the province. Wishing for a singing career, she joined a couple of regional singing contests until she was eventually driven to Manila. She attended Bitaogan Elementary School, St. Brigette High School, University of the East and the University of Hawaii, where she received a BS Commerce with a major in management.

Music career
Papin recorded her second album, Kutob (1978),  containing the song "Bakit" which became a hit among local radio stations. She followed her success with more singles that topped the charts.

Papin went to Las Vegas and managed to revive her career. She became a regular performer in the city and became an instant celebrity. She became the first Filipino artist to host a three-hour telethon on Channel 18 in Los Angeles, California. Currently, she is hosting a television program on LA-18 called Imelda Papin in America. Her radio program is a two-hour program called the "Imelda Papin Voice of the Heart Radio Show" on KLAV 1230 AM (Talk of Las Vegas).

Political career
In 1995, she ran against Luis Villafuerte, Sr. and Jose Bulaong for Governor of the Province of Camarines Sur but was defeated by Villafuerte. In 1998, she was elected as Vice Governor, a post she held for two terms. In 2004, she ran as congresswoman in the province's fourth congressional district but she lost to incumbent Representative Felix R. Alfelor Jr. In 2010, she ran for Senate in the Philippines under Bangon Pilipinas but she lost. In 2013, the Commission on Elections disqualified her from running as congresswoman in the Legislative district of San Jose del Monte City in the province of Bulacan due to lack of residency but reversed its decision on April 25.<ref>[http://www.mb.com.ph/articles/246322/papin-joins-bro-eddie-s-party Comelec allows Imelda Papin to run for Congress in Bulacan"]. GMA News Online.</ref> She went on to lose the election. In 2016, she ran again as congresswoman in the Camarines Sur's fourth congressional district but she lost to incumbent Representative Arnulfo Fuentebella. In 2019, she made a political comeback when she ran for Vice Governor as running mate of Governor Migz Villafuerte against board member Russel Bañes under PDP–Laban and eventually won. In 2022, she ran against Luigi Villafuerte and Rolando Andaya for Governor of the Province of Camarines Sur but was defeated by Villafuerte.

Discography
Albums
Studio albumsImelda (1978, Wonderland Records)Kutob (1978, Wonderland Records)I Love You, Imelda (1979, Wonderland Records)Imelda Papin (1980, Sunshine)Mel (1980, Sunshine)Christmas with Imelda Papin (1980, Sunshine)Love Is... (1983, Alpha Records)Songs & Emotions (1984, Emerald Recording Corporation)The Woman, The Singer (1986, Emerald Recording Corporation)Buhay at Pag-ibig ni Imelda Papin (1992, Alpha Records)Bakit Ikaw Pa? (1994, Alpha Records)Dahil Minamahal Kita (1999, D'Concorde)Phenomenal Hits of Imelda Papin Vol. 1 (1999, D'Concorde)Phenomenal Hits of Imelda Papin Vol. 2 (1999, D'Concorde)Nag-iisang Imelda (2001, Galaxy Records/Universal Records)Iba Ka Sa Lahat (2004, Universal Records)Voice of the Heart (2008, 618 International)Merry Christmas Mahal Ko (2008, 618 International)I Love You (2009, Viva Records/618 International)Bakit? (2010, Universal Records/618 International)

Compilation albumsImelda's Favorite Hits (1980, Wonderland Records)Imelda's Greatest Hits (1981, Sunshine)Special Collector's Edition: Sabik (1994, Vicor)Golden Collection Series: The Best of Imelda Papin featuring: Isang Linggong Pag-ibig and Other Hits... (2001, Alpha Records)Once Again... with Didith Reyes, Geraldine and Imelda Papin Vol. 4 (with Didith Reyes & Geraldine) (2003, Vicor)Puso Sa Puso (2005, Sunshine/Vicor)Greatest Hits (2009, Alpha Music)

Collaboration albumsJukebox King & Queen (with Victor Wood) (1999, D'Concorde)

Singles
"Ako Ba O Siya"
"Ako Nga Ba Ito"
"Bakit?" (1978, re-recorded as "Bakit? (Kung Liligaya Ka sa Piling ng Iba)" in 2001)
"Bakit Ikaw Pa?" (originally by Geraldine) (1994)
"Bakit Kaya"
"Bakit Mo Pa Inibig"
"Bawal"
"Di Totoo"
"Dinggin"
"Habang May Panahon"
"Hinanakit"
"Hindi Ko Kaya" (originally by Richard Reynoso)
"Hindi Maiiwanan"
"Iniibig Ko ang Iniibig Mo" (originally by Luz Loreto and then by Mimi Baylon) (1992)
"Isang Linggong Pag-ibig" (Isang Linggong Pag-ibig movie theme song) (1993)
"Kailangan Ko"
"Kaligayahan Mo'y, Kaligayahan Ko Rin" (1983)
"Kapiling Mo, Kasuyo Ko"
"Katarungan"
"Masakit"
"Minsan" (originally by Bert Dominic)
"Pinag-isa ng Diyos"
"Pinaglaruan"
"Sabik" (1981)
"Sayang Na Sayang"
"Taksil"
"The Winner Takes It All" (originally by ABBA)
"Titig Mo" (1999)
"Titigan Mo Ako" (originally by Baby Shake Rico) (2010)
"Tukso Ka Ba?" (D' Originals'' theme song) (2017)
"Umaga Na Wala Ka Pa" (originally by Eva Eugenio) (1999)
"We Could Have It All" (originally by Maureen McGovern

References

External links
http://www.lasvegassun.com/news/2009/jul/28/manchester-shares-showroom-filipino-star/
 OPM profile

1956 births
Living people
20th-century Filipino women singers
Bicolano people
Bicolano politicians
Filipino women in politics
Filipino actor-politicians
Members of the Camarines Sur Provincial Board
People from San Jose del Monte
Radio Philippines Network personalities
RPN News and Public Affairs people
Singers from Camarines Sur
University of the East alumni